Sounder commuter rail  is a commuter rail service operated by BNSF on behalf of Sound Transit. Service operates Monday through Friday during peak hours from Seattle, Washington, north to Everett and south to Lakewood.

, schedules serve the traditional peak commutes, with most trains running inbound to Seattle in the morning and outbound in the afternoon. Three daily round-trips run the reverse commute to and from Tacoma. Additional Sounder trains operate on some Saturdays and Sundays for travel to and from Seahawks and Sounders games at Lumen Field and Mariners games at T-Mobile Park. Both stadiums are a short walk from King Street Station.

Service history

S Line
The S Line (formerly the South Line) began service with two round trip trains on September 18, 2000, with stops in Tacoma, Sumner and Auburn that terminated in Seattle. Puyallup and Kent stations were added February 5, 2001, with Tukwila being added March 12, 2001. There are currently thirteen round trips on the S Line, with three operating in the reverse commute direction.

In July 2010, Sound Transit reached a new agreement with BNSF, valued at $185 million, which grants Sound Transit permanent access to the S Line corridor, as well as allowing four more daily round trips to begin, starting in 2012 and continuing through 2017.

On October 8, 2012, the extension to South Tacoma and Lakewood stations was inaugurated, with five daily round trips, all of which are in the peak direction, serving the new stations. In September 2016, a mid-day round trip was added between Lakewood and Seattle. In September 2017, two additional round trips were added, bringing the total to eight daily round trips servicing the Lakewood extension.

The average weekday ridership in 2010 on the S Line was 8,300, down 7% from 2009 due to continued low employment in Downtown Seattle. Since then the average ridership has increased and as of October 2015 stood at 14,500 per day.  In 2019, S Line ridership was 16,419 per day.

N Line
The  Everett-to-Seattle N line (formerly North Line) started with a Seahawks game train on December 21, 2003.  Regular service started on December 22 with one morning train to Seattle and one evening train back.  A second round trip train was added on June 6, 2005, to help increase ridership, a third was added in September 2007. In September 2008, an additional train was added to the line, bringing the total number to four round trips in the peak direction. On May 31, 2008, service to Mukilteo station began. There are currently three stops along the N Line: Edmonds, Mukilteo, and Everett.

Additionally, Sound Transit partners with Amtrak Cascades to allow Sounder riders to use the two trains per day that Amtrak Cascades operates to Bellingham, WA and Vancouver, BC through the RailPlus program. This allows commuters to use the Sounder fare structure between Everett and Seattle. The program is available only to riders who use monthly passes. The Amtrak Cascades trains do not stop at Mukilteo nor does Amtrak's Empire Builder from Chicago, Illinois.

Weekday ridership on the N Line was roughly 1,100 in 2010 and was about 1,561 in the first quarter of 2016. Trains on the N Line have been prone to frequent cancellation due to mudslides throughout its history, though WSDOT has begun construction to remedy the problem.

Future expansion

Sound Transit plans to add additional S Line stations at Tillicum and DuPont. The track has already been constructed by Sound Transit with funding from WSDOT as part of the Point Defiance Bypass project. Funding for constructing the two stations was approved in the 2016 Sound Transit 3 ballot measure and is expected to cost $300 million. It was originally scheduled to open in 2036, but was delayed to 2045 due to a systemwide funding gap caused by increased planning costs. The Tillicum station is planned to be located near the intersection of Interstate 5 and Berkeley Street Southwest, adjacent to Joint Base Lewis–McChord. The terminus at DuPont station is planned to be located adjacent to an existing park and ride lot at Interstate 5 and Center Drive.

In addition, Sound Transit plans to extend station platform lengths on the S Line to accommodate trains up to ten cars in length, up from the current seven, and increase service. Both programs were included in the Sound Transit 3 ballot measure and were originally scheduled to be fully completed by 2036, but were also delayed by the systemwide funding gap and subsequent realignment of projects. Platform extensions are scheduled to be complete by 2036, while additional trips on the S Line are scheduled to be implemented by 2046.

Fares

As with Link light rail, Sounder operates using a proof-of-payment fare system and uses distance-based fares; adult fares range from $3.25 to $5.75. Passengers are required to purchase a paper ticket, use a mobile ticket, or tap their ORCA card (and receive a valid permit to travel) before boarding trains. Sound Transit fare inspectors or police officers randomly board trains and check for valid proof-of-payment, issuing warnings or fines to passengers without valid proof-of-payment. Passengers using ORCA cards are charged the maximum fare from the station they are traveling from and are issued a permit to travel when they tap before boarding and, if necessary, receive a refund when they tap after boarding. Discounted fares are offered for youth, seniors and the disabled, and low-income riders qualifying for the ORCA Lift program.

During the COVID-19 pandemic in 2020, fare collection for all Sound Transit services was suspended from March 21 to June 1. Fares on Link and Sounder were reintroduced on June 1 with a discounted rate of $2 for non-ORCA users on Sounder.

Ridership statistics

Rolling stock

References

External links

 S Line schedule
 N Line schedule

 
 
Transportation in Seattle
Transportation in King County, Washington
Transportation in Snohomish County, Washington
Transportation in Pierce County, Washington
Commuter rail in the United States
Passenger rail transportation in Washington (state)
BNSF Railway lines
Railway services introduced in 2000
2000 establishments in Washington (state)